The Communist Party of Argentina (also simply known as "PC") is a communist party in Argentina. The party now forms part of the Frente de Todos, the ruling coalition supporting President Alberto Fernández.

It was founded on January 6, 1918, initially with the name International Socialist Party, after the break with the Socialist Party and in adherence to the Russian October Revolution and the Third International.

From its origin, it maintained an almost automatic alignment with the Communist Party of the Soviet Union, which generated friction with the rest of the national left, which accused the party of struggling more for the geopolitical interests of the Soviet Union than for the effective emergence of a communist revolution in Argentina.

History

From the foundation to the emergence of Peronism 
Following the October Revolution and the rise of Bolsheviks to power in Russia, tensions between the reformist and the revolutionary factions in the Socialist Party of Argentina (Partido Socialista, PS) reached its breaking point: on 6 January 1918, following the PS's refusal to endorse the Bolshevik coup, the revolutionary faction left the Socialist Party and formed the International Socialist Party (Partido Socialista Internacional, PSI), which in March 1918 was rebranded into Communist Party of Argentina (Partido Comunista de la Argentina, PCA).

From its creation, it followed the political line of the Communist Party of the Soviet Union, supporting in general its initiatives and joining the Communist International in 1919. Its alignment with the CPSU in the Stalinist period earned it numerous criticisms by other parties of the political left. Throughout the 1920s it had several splits, being recognized the one of the frontists (1923), the one of the chispistas (pre-Trotskyists) (1925) and the penelonistas (supporters of Bukharin) in 1928, returning many paintings during the 8th PCA Congress that year.

The PCA organized the sending of combatants to the International Brigades and other resources to the Second Spanish Republic during the Spanish Civil War. However, its leader Victorio Codovilla, maintained a leading role in the leadership of the Communist Party of Spain during this period, during the organization of the local NKVD, and in directing participation in the persecution, torture and murder of leaders and militant anarchists, of the POUM and of the International Brigades.

According to the version of Alberto Nadra, a member of the Central Committee until 1989, the party was secretly structured as a political-military organization, and in that character led the first guerrilla movement of the 20th century, in the then National Territory of the Chaco, with specific agreements with the popular gaucho Mate Sewn. The communists would have marched to the mountain and had as objectives properties of La Forestal, Bunge Born, Dreyfuss and the great cotton patrons, making impressive actions. At the beginning of 1945, the Gendarmerie surrounded and detained the Party's main leaders, such as the journalist Salvador "Rómulo" Marini, Simón Duschatsky and Pedro Marini, among others, although, according to Nadra, the "Commander Leonor Cuaretta who initially managed to flee, he was later arrested and murdered on March 30, 1945.15 He also refers to another 200 actions against Nazi targets during the Second World War or the blowing up of 14 Minimax supermarkets on June 28, 1968, although other sources have attributed it to the Armed Forces Revolutionary

During the Second World War, the party maintained an active participation in the international arena in favor of the Soviet Union, organizing aid collections and contributing its leaders to various international tasks. An example of this would be the murder of Leon Trotsky in Mexico in 1940, whose organization was in charge of Codovilla, who at this point enjoyed the confidence of the leadership of the CPSU.

From Peronism to the 1976 dictatorship

As a result of the workers' mobilizations of October 17, 1945 against the dismissal and detention of Juan Domingo Perón, within the party there were questions to the political line of the same and to the leadership headed by Codovilla and in the National Conference of December of that year, Rodolfo Puiggrós openly expressed criticism and demanded to find practical agreements with Perón around the defense of the interests of the workers and the fight against imperialism.

In the elections of 1946 the Communist Party was part of the Democratic Union, opposed to Peronism. Puiggrós was expelled in 1947 and founded the Communist Workers Movement together with some communist syndicalists supporters of the alliance with Peronism.

The student of chemistry and communist militant Ernesto Mario Bravo was kidnapped at his home on June 17, 1951 and tortured by the police. His case was reported by the doctor who treated him, first in the Special Section and then in a fifth where he was transferred. The government, however, emphatically denied the facts:

On June 17, 1955, the police of Rosario arrested, tortured and disappeared Juan Ingallinella, a doctor and party leader, who had participated in the publication of pamphlets in defense of the government days before, denouncing the masterminds of the bombing and strafing of the Plaza de Mayo, in which more than 350 people were killed and more than 700 wounded and mutilated.

After the overthrow of Perón, the party criticized the loss of democratic liberties and the prohibition of the partisans who carried out the coup of 1955. Although Peronism was the main objective of the persecutions, the increase of the repression in the government Arambruru also led him to repress the members of the Communist Party. In 1956 the Ministry of the Interior, Eduardo Busso, denounced that the Union of Argentine Women and the Argentine League for Human Rights had links with the party. In April of the following year, the cancellation of legal status was announced and 360 militants were arrested and 56 local supporters closed.

Adhered to the thesis of the XX Congress of the CPSU, which postulated the peaceful transition to socialism through the electoral route, among other points. In 1967 it underwent the biggest organized split in its history, which would lead to 4,000 members to separate, later forming the Revolutionary Communist Party, on January 6, 1968.

During the 1970s, the policy of the guerrilla movements in Latin America did not follow. Before the crisis of the government of Isabel Perón and the imminence of a military coup, the PCA began to "promote a joint, unitary, of the political parties, of the Church and of the Armed Forces towards the establishment of a civic-military cabinet ", says that later it would turn into the claim of a" civic-military convergence ".

The Central Committee of the PCA 27 28 did not condemn the coup d'état of 1976 and the consequent military dictatorship established at the beginning.26 29 30 31 32 A few days after the coup, an official publication of the PC affirmed with respect to the new president: "Regarding his more precise formulations (...) we affirm emphatically that they constitute the basis of a liberating program that we share (...). he affirms that no easy, miraculous or spectacular solutions will be given, be assured that nobody expects them ... General Videla does not ask for adhesion, but understanding, he has it ".33 This position was based on a political characterization that "presented the Videla-Viola duo as the wing of renewed democracy, in front of a Pinochet wing, a non-predominant sector within the Armed Forces, channeled through Emilio Massera and Luciano Menéndez" and coincided with the support that the government of the Soviet Union offered the military dictatorship.31 26 This characterization was not easily accepted by all its militancy, which, between internal discussions, was distributed among those who trusted the word of the leaders and those who preferred to act for your account or refusing to accept directions from the addresses.34

The PCA was not affected by laws 21,322, 21,323 and 21,325 that dissolved some parties and left groups; its activity was suspended and, according to the report of the IACHR, like nine other political parties, it was subjected to "flexible government behavior" and was received in interviews by the military government.35 Despite this, a large number of PCA militants were persecuted, tortured, murdered and disappeared during the dictatorship.

Alberto Nadra affirms that the accusations made by the PC before the IACHR allowed for the first time this organism to assume the existence of "state terrorism" in Argentina, taking as "pilot case" that of the student Inés Ollero, as well as the detention of almost 1,600 militants, the kidnapping of more than 500 and the murder of 150, show the objective resistance to the dictatorship, regardless of the public position of the PC.

In taking stock of this period on the occasion of the 30th anniversary of the coup d'état, the PCA issued a statement in which it stated: "each force in its own way, it cost us all to understand the novelty of the dictatorship imposed by the Yankees and supported by a vast political and social space [...] We made mistakes in assessing the internal contradictions of the Armed Forces, overestimating them and considering taking advantage of them in the fight against fascism. the actions in progress and the level of hegemony that the most pro-imperialist sectors had reached from the start. [...] We are not, as we know and we do not hide, an infallible force neither in the sayings nor in the behaviors, but we are proud of belonging to a party that resisted the attacks of the dictatorship with dignity and that gave its contribution to the solidarity struggle from the first day, in the interior of the country and also in n the outside ".

The PCA appeared as a plaintiff in two criminal cases against State terrorism exercised by the dictatorship.

One of those causes is that of the Floreal case Edgardo Avellaneda, known as "el Negrito", born in Rosario on May 14, 1961. He was a militant of the Communist Youth Federation and was in charge of the propaganda tasks in his neighborhood. He lived with his mother Iris Etelvina Pereyra de Avellaneda and his father Floreal Avellaneda, delegate of the Tensa textile factory, both militants of the Communist Party.

He was 15 years old when he was abducted from his home with his mother, he was illegally detained and tortured. His body was found on May 14, 1976 in the waters of the Río de la Plata. His body was found with serious signs of having suffered physical torture and having been the victim of impalement.

National Congresses 
 I Congress – held in 1918
 II Congress – held in May 1919, the party breaks with the Second International
 III Congress – held in December 1920
 IV Congress – held in January 1922
 V Congress – held in July 1923
 VI Congress – held in July 1924
 VII Congress – held in December 1925
 VIII Congress – held in November 1928
 IX Congress – held in January 1938
 X Congress – held in November 1941
 XI Congress – held in 1946
 XII Congress – held in 1963
 XIII Congress – held between 25 and March 29 of 1969
 XIV Congress – held on August 22 of 1973, the party resolves to support the candidacy of Perón in the September 1973 presidential election.
 XV Congress – held on July 6 of 1982
 XVI Congress – held in 1986
 XVII Congress – held in 1990
 Extraordinary Congress – held 1996, a group of militants breaks with the party and forms the PCCE

See also
Communist Party of Argentina (Extraordinary Congress)
Federación de Sindicatos Ferroviarios
Politicians of the Communist Party of Argentina

References

External links

 PCA official website

 
1918 establishments in Argentina
International Meeting of Communist and Workers Parties